Kerry-Anne Guse and Kristine Radford won in the final 6–4, 6–4 against Rika Hiraki and Sung-Hee Park.

Seeds
Champion seeds are indicated in bold text while text in italics indicates the round in which those seeds were eliminated.

 Claudia Porwik /  Linda Wild (quarterfinals)
 Kerry-Anne Guse /  Kristine Radford (champions)
 Laxmi Poruri /  Shaun Stafford (quarterfinals)
 Miho Saeki /  Yuka Yoshida (first round)

Draw

Main draw

References

External links

TVA Cup
TVA Cup - Doubles